Marguerite d'Hauser (1720–1802), also called Marguerite de Wendel and Madame d'Hayange, was a French industrialist. 

She was married to Charles de Wendel (d. 1784), owner of the Wendel Iron works in Lorraine. She managed the Iron Works for her spouse during his old age, and after his death for her sons, who preferred to tend to other businesses. The Wendel Iron works belonged to the most notable in France, as it stood for a large part of the French weapon industry, and she managed business contrats and negotiations with the government. 

During the French revolution her sons and son-in-laws emigrated. During the Reign of Terror, she managed the contacts with the Robespierre government and was put under supervision by the government. Her grandson was executed, and she was eventually arrested and imprisoned and the Ironw works was confiscated by the state. She was released after the fall of Robespierre.

References 

 Béatrice Craig, Women and Business since 1500: Invisible Presences in Europe and North America?
 Harold James,  Family Capitalism: Wendels, Haniels, Falcks, and the Continental European Model
 Paul W. Thurman, Robert S. Nason,  Father-Daughter Succession in Family Business: A Cross-Cultural Perspective

1720 births
1802 deaths
18th-century French businesswomen
18th-century French businesspeople
French ironmasters
People of the French Revolution
18th-century ironmasters
19th-century ironmasters